Annalee Blysse is an American paranormal romance novelist. Born and raised in Alaska, she recently moved to Nevada.
She writes romances, and erotic romance, especially futuristic and paranormal.

Selected works 

Novels 
 Starlit Destiny (2005) - Nominee for 2005 CAPA for Paranormal Romance at The Romance Studio

Novellas 
"Lord of the Night" in Relic (2006)
Never A Sunset (2005)

External links
 Annalee Blysse's Website
 Author Page at NCP—New Concepts Publishing
 Passionate Ink—Special Interest Chapter of Romance Writers of America for erotic romance writers.

Year of birth missing (living people)
American paranormal romance writers
21st-century American novelists
American women novelists
Writers from Alaska
Writers from Nevada
Living people
Women romantic fiction writers
21st-century American women writers